Adeleke University is a private owned institution, located in Ede, one of the popular town in Osun State, southwestern Region Nigeria. It was established by Chief Adedeji Adeleke through the Springtime Development Foundation (SDF), a philanthropic, non-profit organisation established by Chief Adedeji to assist less privileged students in obtaining a quality higher education.  As a faith-based institution of higher learning it is closely aligned with (but not owned and/or operated by) the Seventh-day Adventist Church and its philosophy of Christian Education.  As such it is a part of the Seventh-day Adventist education system, the world's second largest Christian school system.

Academic divisions

  Faculty of Arts
  Faculty of Basic Medical Sciences
  Faculty of Business and Social Sciences
  Faculty of Engineering
  Faculty of Law
  Faculty of Science

References

Universities and colleges in Nigeria
Universities and colleges affiliated with the Seventh-day Adventist Church